Iipumbu Wendelinus Shiimi is a Namibian economist who has been the Minister of Finance since 2020. Before that he served as governor of the Bank of Namibia from 2010 until 2020.

Early life and education
Shiimi holds a Master of Science degree in Financial Economics (1998), and a Postgraduate Diploma in Economics (Economic Principles) from the University of London. He also holds a Diploma in Foreign Trade and Management from the Maastricht School of Management in the Netherlands, an Honours degree in Economics and from the University of Western Cape in South Africa and a Bachelor of Commerce degree in Economics and Accounting from the University of Western Cape. He underwent specialised training in Management from University of Stellenbosch and Wits Business School as well as other specialised training in economics and finance in Tanzania and USA, as well as at the Bank of England and Reserve Bank of South Africa.

Career
Shiimi started working at the Namibia Economic Policy Research Unit (NEPRU) in 1994. He joined the Bank of Namibia as a Senior Researcher in the Research Department and became a Manager of the Economics Division in the same department in 1997. In 1999, he became Manager of the Modelling and Forecasting Division in the Research Department. In 2000, he took over as Manager of Statistics Division in the Research Department. In 2001, he became the Deputy Head of Research Department and in 2002 he became Chief Economist and Head of Research Department. In June 2006, Shiimi became a Senior Manager in the Banking Supervision Department until his appointment in November 2006 as Assistant Governor. In this role he was responsible for providing strategic direction to the operations of the Bank which included managing foreign exchange reserves, banking supervision, economic stability and financial monitoring.

Shiimi was appointed as a new central bank chief on March 25, 2010, by President Hifikepunye Pohamba. He took over from Tom Alweendo, who was appointed Director-General of the Namibian National Planning Commission and later Minister of Mines and Energy. President Hage Geingob re-appointed him to a second term in December 2016.

Other activities
 International Monetary Fund (IMF), Ex-Officio Member of the Board of Governors (2010–2020)
 World Bank, Ex-Officio Alternate Member of the Board of Governors (2010–2020)

References

Living people
Finance ministers of Namibia
Governors of the Bank of Namibia
Members of the National Assembly (Namibia)
SWAPO politicians
1970 births